The Sony Ericsson W890i is a high-end mobile phone released on March 3, 2008. It is available in the colours of "Mocha Brown", "Sparkling Silver" and "Espresso Black", at 9.9 mm thick. It shares many design clues with the original iPhone, mainly on the rear. Its casing is made up of highly polished aluminium with little use of plastic.

Features
The phone incorporates a 3.2-megapixel camera taking photos in 2048x1536px resolution without flash or autofocus and video is recorded at QVGA resolution. An FM radio, which was lacking on the W880i, is also included. The phone utilises version 3.0 of the Walkman system software and includes SensMe technology, whereby the user can select which mood of music they would like to listen to. It also has a 950mAh Li-Po battery.

References

W890i
Mobile phones introduced in 2008